This is a list of film series that have six entries.

A

 Aces Go Places (a.k.a. Mad Mission)
Aces Go Places (1982)
Aces Go Places 2 (1983)
Aces Go Places 3 (1984)
Aces Go Places 4 (1986)
Aces Go Places 5 (1989)
'97 Aces Go Places (1997)
The Adventures of Bill and Bob
The Adventures of Bill and Bob (1920)
Catching a Coon (1921)
The American Badger (1921)The Civet Cat (1921)The Skunk (1921)Trailing the Coyote (1921)Alien Nation *Alien Nation (1988)Alien Nation: Dark Horizon (1994) (TV)Alien Nation: Body and Soul (1995) (TV)Alien Nation: Millennium (1996) (TV)Alien Nation: The Enemy Within (1996) (TV)Alien Nation: The Udara Legacy (1997) (TV)Ang Panday *Ang Panday (1980)Pagbabalik ng Panday (1981)Ang Panday: Ikatlong yugto (1982)Ang Panday IV (Ika-apat na aklat) (1984)Dugo ng Panday (1993)Hiwaga ng Panday (1998)

BBibi Blocksberg * (2002) (2004) (2014) (2014) (2016) (2017)Boys LifeBoys Life: Three Stories of Love, Lust, and Liberation (1994)Boys Life 2 (1997)Boys Life 3 (2000)Boys Life 4: Four Play (2003)Boys Life 5 (2006) (V)Boys Life 6 (2007) (V)Bring It OnBring It On (2000)Bring It On Again (2004) (V)Bring It On: All or Nothing (2006) (V)Bring It On: In It to Win It (2007) (V)Bring It On: Fight to the Finish (2009) (V)Bring It On: Worldwide Cheersmack (2017) (V)The BrotherhoodThe Brotherhood (2001) (V)The Brotherhood II: Young Warlocks (2001) (V)The Brotherhood III: Young Demons (2002) (V)The Brotherhood IV: The Complex (2005) (V)The Brotherhood V: Alumni (2009) (V)The Brotherhood VI: Initiation (2009) (V)

CCappy RicksCappy Ricks (1921)The Go-Getter (1923)More Pay - Less Work (1926)Cappy Ricks Returns (1935)Affairs of Cappy Ricks (1937)The Go Getter (1937)Coplan (Agent FX 18) * (1957)FX 18 Secret Agent (1964) (1964)FX 18 Superspy (1965)Mexican Slayride (1967)Coplan Saves His Skin (1968)

DD@bbeD@bbe (2006) (2009) (2012)D@bbe: Curse of the Jinn (2013) (2014) (2015)DorfDorf on Golf (1987) (V)Dorf's Golf Bible (1987) (V)Dorf and the First Games of Mount Olympus (1988) (V)Dorf Goes Auto Racing (1990) (V)Dorf Goes Fishing (1993) (V)Dorf on the Diamond (1996) (V)Dr. Christian *Meet Dr. Christian (1939)Remedy for Riches (1940)The Courageous Dr. Christian (1940)Dr. Christian Meets the Women (1940)Melody for Three (1941)They Meet Again (1941)

EEberhoferkrimi (2013) (2014) (2016) (2017) (2018) (2019)Ed McBain's 87th Precinct *Cop Hater (1958)The Pusher (1960)Fuzz (1972)Ed McBain's 87th Precinct: Lightning (1995) (TV)Ed McBain's 87th Precinct: Ice (1996) (TV)Ed McBain's 87th Precinct: Heatwave (1997) (TV)

F
Frank Janek *Internal Affairs (1988) (TV)Murder in Black and White (1990) (TV)Murder Times Seven (1990) (TV)Terror on Track 9 (1992) (TV)The Forget-Me-Not Murders (1994) (TV)Janek: The Silent Betrayal (1994) (TV)

GLe gendarmeLe gendarme de Saint-Tropez (1964)Le gendarme à New York (1965)Le gendarme se marie (1968)Le gendarme en balade (1970)Le gendarme et les extra-terrestres (1979)Le gendarme et les gendarmettes (1982)God of GamblersGod of Gamblers (1989)God of Gamblers Returns (1994)God of Gamblers 3: The Early Stage (1996)From Vegas to Macau (2014)From Vegas to Macau II (2015)From Vegas to Macau III (2016)Godzilla **** Millennium era (1999–2004) Godzilla 2000: Millennium (1999)Godzilla vs. Megaguirus (2000)Godzilla, Mothra and King Ghidorah: Giant Monsters All-Out Attack (2001)Godzilla Against Mechagodzilla (2002)Godzilla: Tokyo S.O.S. (2003)Godzilla: Final Wars (2004)

H
 Hailey Dean MysteriesMurder, With Love (2016) (TV)Deadly Estate (2017) (TV)Dating is Murder (2017) (TV)2+2=Murder (2018) (TV)A Marriage Made for Murder (2018) (TV)A Will to Kill (2018) (TV)Hausfrauen-ReportHausfrauen-Report 1: Unglaublich, aber wahr (1971)Hausfrauen-Report 2 (1971)Hausfrauen-Report 3 (1972)Hausfrauen Report international (1973)Hausfrauen-Report 4 (1973)Hausfrauen-Report 6: Warum gehen Frauen fremd? (1978)Herbie *The Love Bug (1968)Herbie Rides Again (1974)Herbie Goes to Monte Carlo (1977)Herbie Goes Bananas (1980)The Love Bug (1997) (TV)Herbie: Fully Loaded (2005)Hercules: The Legendary Journeys *** (a)Hercules and the Amazon Women (1994) (TV)Hercules and the Lost Kingdom (1994) (TV)Hercules and the Circle of Fire (1994) (TV)Hercules in the Underworld (1994) (TV)Hercules in the Maze of the Minotaur (1994) (TV)Hercules and Xena – The Animated Movie: The Battle for Mount Olympus (1998) (V)Hideshi Hino's Theater of HorrorThe Boy from Hell (2004) (a.k.a. Jigoku Kozou)Dead Girl Walking (2004)Lizard Baby (2004)The Ravaged House: Zoroku's Disease (2004) (a.k.a. Tadareta Ie: Zoroku no Kibyo)The Doll Cemetery (2004)Death Train (2004)Highlander *** (a)Highlander (1986)Highlander II: The Quickening (1991)Highlander III: The Sorcerer (1994)Highlander: Endgame (2000)Highlander: The Search for Vengeance (2007) (V)Highlander: The Source (2007) (TV)Home AloneHome Alone (1990)Home Alone 2: Lost in New York (1992)Home Alone 3 (1997)Home Alone 4: Taking Back the House (2002) (TV)Home Alone: The Holiday Heist (2012) (TV)Home Sweet Home Alone (2021)HomunculusHomunculus, 1. Teil (1916)Homunculus, 2. Teil - Das geheimnisvolle Buch (1916)Homunculus, 3. Teil - Die Liebestragödie des Homunculus (1916)Homunculus, 4. Teil - Die Rache des Homunculus (1916)Homunculus, 5. Teil - Die Vernichtung der Menschheit (1916)Homunculus, 6. Teil - Das Ende des Homunculus (1916)

IIce Age (A)Ice Age (2002) Ice Age: The Meltdown (2006) Ice Age: Dawn of the Dinosaurs (2009)Ice Age: Continental Drift (2012)Ice Age: Collision Course (2016)The Ice Age Adventures of Buck Wild (2022) (spin-off)The Incredible Hulk *The Incredible Hulk (1977) (TV)The Return of the Incredible Hulk (1977) (TV)Bride of the Incredible Hulk (1978) (TV)The Incredible Hulk Returns (1988) (TV)The Trial of the Incredible Hulk (1989) (TV)The Death of the Incredible Hulk (1990) (TV)Inner Sanctum MysteriesCalling Dr. Death (1943)Weird Woman (1944)Dead Man's Eyes (1944)The Frozen Ghost (1945)Strange Confession (1945)Pillow of Death (1945)Inspecteur LavardinChicken with Vinegar (1985)Inspecteur Lavardin (1986) (1988) (TV)Le diable en ville (1989) (TV) (1989) (TV) (1990) (TV)The Invisible Man (Universal series)The Invisible Man (1933)The Invisible Man Returns (1940)The Invisible Woman (1940)Invisible Agent (1942)The Invisible Man's Revenge (1944)Abbott and Costello Meet the Invisible Man (1951)

JJurassic ParkJurassic Park (1993)The Lost World: Jurassic Park (1997)Jurassic Park III (2001)Jurassic World (2015)Jurassic World: Fallen Kingdom (2018)Jurassic World Dominion (2022)Jackass Jackass: The Movie (2002)Jackass Number Two (2006)Jackass Presents: Mat Hoffman's Tribute to Evel Knievel (2008) (V) (spin-off)Jackass 3D (2010)Jackass Presents: Bad Grandpa (2013) (spin-off)Jackass Forever (2022)

KKarate WarriorKarate Warrior (1987) (1988) (1991) (1992) (1992) (1993)Kim Du-hanShillog Kim Du-han (1974)Hyeobgag Kim Du-han (1975)Kim Du-han 3 (1975)Kim Du-han 4 (1975)Kim Du-han hyeong shirasoni hyeong (1981)Kim Du-hangwa seodaemun (1981)

LLone Wolf and Cub *Lone Wolf and Cub: Sword of Vengeance (1972)Lone Wolf and Cub: Baby Cart at the River Styx (1972)Lone Wolf and Cub: Baby Cart to Hades (1972)Lone Wolf and Cub: Baby Cart in Peril (1972)Lone Wolf and Cub: Baby Cart in the Land of Demons (1973)Lone Wolf and Cub: White Heaven in Hell (1974)Night of the Living DeadNight of the Living Dead (1968)Dawn of the Dead (1978)Day of the Dead (1985)Land of the Dead (2005)Diary of the Dead (2007)Survival of the Dead (2010)

MMărgelatuDrumul oaselor (1980)  Trandafirul galben (1982)Misterele Bucureștilor (1983)Masca de argint (1985)Colierul de turcoaze (1986)Totul se plătește (1987)MaechunMaechun (1988)Maechun 2 (1989)Maechun 3 (1993)Maechun 4 (1994)Maechun 5 (1994)Maechun 6 (1995)Mano PoMano Po (2002)Mano Po 2: My Home (2003)Mano Po III: My Love (2004)Mano Po 4: Ako Legal Wife (2005)Mano Po 5: Gua Ai Di (2006)Mano Po 6: A Mother's Love (2007)The MarineThe Marine (2006) The Marine 2 (2009) (V)The Marine 3: Homefront (2013) (V)The Marine 4: Moving Target (2015) (V)The Marine 5: Battleground (2017) (V)The Marine 6: Close Quarters (2018) (V)Mazinger ** (A)Mazinger Z Vs. Devilman (1974)Mazinger Z Vs. The Great General of Darkness (1974)Great Mazinger tai Getter Robot (1975)Great Mazinger tai Getter Robot G: Kuchu Daigekitotsu (1975)UFO Robot Grendizer tai Great Mazinger (1976)Grendizer, Getter Robot G, Great Mazinger: Kessen! Daikaijuu (1976)Megalopolis Expressway Trial (a.k.a. Freeway Speedway. Tokyo Speedway)Megalopolis Expressway Trial (1988)Megalopolis Expressway Trial 2 (1990)Megalopolis Expressway Trial 3 (1991)Megalopolis Expressway Trial 4 (1992)Megalopolis Expressway Trial 5: Final Battle (1993)Megalopolis Expressway Trial Max (1996)Middle-earthThe Lord of the Rings: The Fellowship of the Ring (2001)The Lord of the Rings: The Two Towers (2002)The Lord of the Rings: The Return of the King (2003)The Hobbit: An Unexpected Journey (2012) (prequel)The Hobbit: The Desolation of Smaug (2013) (prequel)The Hobbit: The Battle of the Five Armies (2014) (prequel)Mountain StrawberriesMountain Strawberries (1982)Mountain Strawberries 2 (1985)Mountain Strawberries 3 (1987)Mountain Strawberries 4 (1991)Mountain Strawberries 5 (1992)Mountain Strawberries 6 (1994)Mr. WongMr. Wong, Detective (1938)The Mystery of Mr. Wong (1939)Mr. Wong in Chinatown (1939)The Fatal Hour (1940)Doomed to Die (1940)Phantom of Chinatown (1940)
The Mummy (Universal film series)The Mummy (1932)The Mummy's Hand (1940)The Mummy's Tomb (1942)The Mummy's Ghost (1944)The Mummy's Curse (1944)Abbott and Costello Meet the Mummy (1955)

OOnce Upon A Time In ChinaOnce Upon a Time in China (1991)Once Upon a Time in China II (1992)Once Upon a Time in China III (1993)Once Upon a Time in China IV (1993)Once Upon a Time in China V (1994)Once Upon a Time in China and America (1997)

PPedro Penduko ***Pedro Penduko (1954)Ang Mahiwagang Daigdig ni Pedro Penduko (1973) Bagsik at Kamandag ni Pedro Penduko (1974)Ang Pagbabalik ni Pedro Penduko]] (1994)Pedro Penduko, Episode II: The Return of the Comeback (2000)Penduko (pre-production)Perry Mason (Warner Bros. Series)The Case of the Howling Dog (1934)The Case of the Curious Bride (1935)The Case of the Lucky Legs (1935)The Case of the Velvet Claws (1936)The Case of the Black Cat (1936)The Case of the Stuttering Bishop (1937)Polt (2000) (TV) (2001) (TV) (2003) (TV) (2003) (TV) (2013) (TV) (2018) (TV)

RPte Frank RandleSomewhere in England (1942)Somewhere in Camp (1943)Somewhere on Leave (1943)Somewhere in Civvies (1942)Somewhere in Politics (1949)It's a Grand Life (1953)Recep İvedik *Recep İvedik (2008) Recep İvedik 2 (2009) Recep İvedik 3 (2010)Recep İvedik 4 (2014)Recep İvedik 5 (2017)Recep İvedik 6 (2019)Resident EvilResident Evil (2002)Resident Evil: Apocalypse (2004)Resident Evil: Extinction (2007)Resident Evil: Afterlife (2010)Resident Evil: Retribution (2012)Resident Evil: The Final Chapter (2016)Rugrats ** (alternate series)The Rugrats Movie (1998)Rugrats: Acorn Nuts and Diapey Butts (2000) (TV)Rugrats in Paris: The Movie (2000)Rugrats Go Wild! (2003)Rugrats: Tales from the Crib – Snow White (2005) (V)Rugrats: Tales from the Crib – Three Jacks and a Beanstalk (2006) (V)

SScream *Scream (1996)Scream 2 (1997)Scream 3 (2000)Scream 4 (2011)Scream (2022)Scream VI (2023)Scattergood BainesScattergood Baines (1941)Scattergood Pulls the Strings (1941)Scattergood Meets Broadway (1941)Scattergood Rides High (1942)Scattergood Survives a Murder (1942)Cinderella Swings It (1943)Sexton Blake *Sexton Blake and the Bearded Doctor (1935)Sexton Blake and the Mademoiselle (1936)Sexton Blake and the Hooded Terror (1938)Meet Sexton Blake (1945)The Echo Murders (1945)Murder at Site 3 (1958)Sexy SusanThe Sweet Sins of Sexy Susan (1967)Sexy Susan Sins Again (1968)House of Pleasure (1969)Frau Wirtin treibt es jetzt noch toller (1970)Frau Wirtin bläst auch gern Trompete (1970)The Countess Died of Laughter (1973)
Shamrock EllisonHostile Country (1950)Marshal of Heldorado (1950)Crooked River (1950)Colorado Ranger (1950)West of the Brazos (1950)Fast on the Draw (1950)The Six Million Dollar Man **The Six Million Dollar Man: The Moon and the Desert (1973) (TV) (Pilot of the TV series)The Six Million Dollar Man: Wine, Women and War (1973) (TV)The Six Million Dollar Man: Solid Gold Kidnapping (1973) (TV)The Return of the Six Million Dollar Man and the Bionic Woman (1987) (TV)Bionic Showdown: The Six Million Dollar Man and the Bionic Woman (1989) (TV)Bionic Ever After? (1994) (TV)SoldaterkammeraterSoldaterkammerater (1958)Soldaterkammerater rykker ud (1959)Soldaterkammerater på vagt (1960)Soldaterkammerater på efterårsmanøvre (1961)Soldaterkammerater på sjov (1962)Soldaterkammerater på bjørnetjeneste (1968)Space Battleship Yamato **** (A)Space Battleship Yamato (1977)Farewell to Space Battleship Yamato (1978)Yamato: The New Voyage (1979) (TV)Be Forever Yamato (1980)Final Yamato (1983)Space Battleship Yamato: Resurrection (2009)Star WreckStar Wreck (1992) (V)Star Wreck II: The Old Shit (1994) (V)Star Wreck III: The Wrath of the Romuclans (1994) (V)Star Wreck IV: Kilpailu (1996) (V)Star Wreck V: Lost Contact (1997) (V)Star Wreck: In the Pirkinning (2005) (V)Shrek * (A)Shrek (2001)Shrek 2 (2004)Shrek the Third (2007)Shrek Forever After (2010)Puss in Boots (2011) (spin-off)Puss in Boots: The Last Wish (2022) (spin-off)Step UpStep Up (2006)Step Up 2: The Streets (2008)Step Up 3D (2010)Step Up Revolution (2012)Step Up: All In (2014)Step Up: Year of the Dance (2019) (spin-off)The StrangerSummoned by Shadows (1992) (V)More Than A Messiah (1992) (V)In Memory Alone (1993) (V)The Terror Game (1994) (V)Breach of the Peace (1994) (V)Eye of the Beholder (1996) (V)SuneSune's Summer (1993)Sunes familie (1997)Håkan Bråkan & Josef (2004)The Anderssons in Greece (2012)The Anderssons Hit the Road (2013)The Anderssons Rock the Mountains (2014)Suomisen perheSuomisen perhe (1941)Suomisen Ollin tempaus (1942)Suomisen taiteilijat (1943)Suomisen Olli rakastuu (1944)Suomisen Olli yllättää (1945)Taas tapaamme Suomisen perheen (1959)
Superman (1978 film series)Superman (1978)Superman II (1980)Superman III (1983)Supergirl (1984) (spin-off)Superman IV: The Quest for Peace (1987)Superman Returns (2006)

TTactical UnitPTU (2003) (a.k.a. PTU: Police Tactical Unit, Tactical Unit: Into the Perilous Night)Tactical Unit: The Code (2008)Tactical Unit: No Way Out (2009)Tactical Unit: Human Nature (2009)Tactical Unit: Comrades in Arms (2009)Tactical Unit: Partners (2009)The Thin ManThe Thin Man (1934)After the Thin Man (1936)Another Thin Man (1939)Shadow of the Thin Man (1941)The Thin Man Goes Home (1944)Song of the Thin Man (1947)Terminator *The Terminator (1984)Terminator 2: Judgment Day (1991)Terminator 3: Rise of the Machines (2003)Terminator Salvation (2009)Terminator Genisys (2015)Terminator: Dark Fate (2019) Tinker Bell ***Tinker Bell (2008) (V)Tinker Bell and the Lost Treasure (2009) (V)Tinker Bell and the Great Fairy Rescue (2010) (V)Secret of the Wings (2012) (V)The Pirate Fairy (2014) (V)Tinker Bell and the Legend of the NeverBeast (2014) (V)
 Toy Story * (A)
 Toy Story (1995)
 Toy Story 2 (1999)
 Buzz Lightyear of Star Command: The Adventure Begins (2000) (V) (spin-off)
 Toy Story 3 (2010)
 Toy Story 4 (2019)
 Lightyear (2022) (spin-off)TrancersTrancers (1985)Trancers II (1991) (V)Trancers III (1992) (V)Trancers 4: Jack of Swords (1994) (V)Trancers 5: Sudden Deth (1994) (V)Trancers 6 (2002) (V)

UUniversal SoldierUniversal Soldier (1992)Universal Soldier II: Brothers in Arms (1998) (TV)Universal Soldier III: Unfinished Business (1998) (TV)Universal Soldier: The Return (1999)Universal Soldier: Regeneration (2009) (V)Universal Soldier: Day of Reckoning (2012) (V)Urusei Yatsura *Urusei Yatsura: Only You (1983)Urusei Yatsura 2: Beautiful Dreamer (1984)Urusei Yatsura 3: Remember My Love (1985)Urusei Yatsura 4: Lum the Forever (1986)Urusei Yatsura 5: The Final Chapter (1988)Urusei Yatsura 6: Always My Darling (1991)

VNational Lampoon's Vacation *National Lampoon's Vacation (1983)National Lampoon's European Vacation (1985)National Lampoon's Christmas Vacation (1989)Vegas Vacation (1997)National Lampoon's Christmas Vacation 2 (2003) (TV) (spin-off)Vacation (2015)
V/H/S ***V/H/S (2012)V/H/S/2 (2013)V/H/S: Viral (2014)V/H/S/94 (2021)V/H/S/99 (2022)V/H/S/85 (2023)

WThe Wild Soccer Bunch (2003) (2005) (2006) (2007) (2008) (2016)Whispering CorridorsWhispering Corridors (1998)Memento Mori (1999)Wishing Stairs (2003)Voice (2005)A Blood Pledge (2009) The Humming'' (2020)

References

06
^